Marjorie Corbett (12 May 1912 – 27 July 1995) was a British stage, voice actress, puppeteer, and film actress, she was the wife of Sooty's creator, Harry Corbett.

Earliest Appearances on Film 
Corbett appeared on stage in several of the Aldwych farces. In the 1930s, she appeared in nine films, including two adaptations of the Aldwych plays. She appeared as a leading lady in quota quickies such as The Reverse Be My Lot and Michael Powell's The Price of a Song.

Retirement and Sooty Years 
During her retirement of acting on film, Marjorie married Sooty creator Harry Corbett when she later plays the original voice of Soo from The Sooty Show alongside Harry Corbett and later his son Matthew Corbett from 1964 until 1981. She later retired again in 1981 with her character Soo being revoiced by Brenda Longman.

Personal life and death 
During her performance of Soo, Marjorie was a heavy smoker, which leads by voicing Soo to make her sound older and being asked to be replaced, Marjorie later retired again for 14 years until she died on 27 July 1995.

Selected filmography
 Thark (1932)
 Turkey Time (1933)
 The Broken Rosary (1934)
 The Price of a Song (1935)
 Pay Box Adventure (1936)
 The Reverse Be My Lot (1937)
 The Sooty Show - As Soo (1964–1981)

References

Bibliography
 Wearing, J.P. The London Stage 1940-1949: A Calendar of Productions, Performers, and Personnel. Rowman & Littlefield, 2014.

1912 births
1995 deaths
British film actresses
Actresses from London
20th-century British actresses
20th-century English women
20th-century English people
English puppeteers
British puppeteers